The last, 31st edition of the FIBA Korać Cup occurred between September 25, 2001 and April 17, 2002. The tournament was won by Nancy, who beat Lokomotiv Rostov in the final.

The competition was replaced with FIBA Europe Champions Cup in season 2002–2003 and with FIBA EuroChallenge in later seasons.

Team allocation 
The labels in the parentheses show how each team qualified for the place of its starting round

 1st, 2nd, etc.: League position after Playoffs
 WC: Wild card

Preliminary round

|}

First round

|}

Round of 32

Round of 16

|}

Quarter finals

|}

Semi finals

|}

Finals

|}

See also
2001–02 Euroleague
2001–02 FIBA Saporta Cup

References

External links
 FIBA Europe
 Eurobasket.com

2001–02
2001–02 in European basketball